Gerald is a village in the Canadian province of Saskatchewan within the Rural Municipality of Spy Hill No. 152 and Census Division No. 5.

History 
Gerald incorporated as a village on March 25, 1953.

Demographics 

See also 

 List of communities in Saskatchewan
 Villages of Saskatchewan

References

Villages in Saskatchewan
Spy Hill No. 152, Saskatchewan
Division No. 5, Saskatchewan